Shakira Austin (born July 25, 2000) is an American professional basketball player for the Washington Mystics of the Women's National Basketball Association (WNBA). She played college basketball at Maryland and Ole Miss.

Playing career

College career
Austin was rated as the fourth ranked player in the nation in the 2018 recruiting class and the second ranked forward. She was also a 2018 McDonald's High School All-American. Austin signed with Maryland out of high school. Following her first season at Maryland in 2018–19, Austin was selected to the All-Big Ten Freshman Team after a school record 89 blocks. Following Austin's second and final season at Maryland in 2019–20, she was named to the All-Big Ten Second Team. After her sophomore season at Maryland, Austin announced her transfer to Ole Miss.

Austin was awarded the Gillom Trophy in 2021.

Professional career
On April 11, 2022, Austin was drafted third overall by the Washington Mystics in the 2022 WNBA draft.

In September 2022, Austin signed with the Israeli champions Elitzur Ramla, until the end of the season.

WNBA career statistics

Regular season

|-
| align="left" | 2022
| align="left" | Washington
| 36 || 32 || 21.6 || .547 || .000 || .624 || 6.5 || 0.9 || 0.7 || 0.8 ||1.5 || 8.7
|-
| align="left" | Career
| align="left" | 1 year, 1 team
| 36 || 32 || 21.6 || .547 || .000 || .624 || 6.5 || 0.9 || 0.7 || 0.8 ||1.5 || 8.7

Playoffs

|-
| align="left" | 2022
| align="left" | Washington
| 2 || 2 || 27.0 || .462 || .000 || .500 || 7.5 || 1.0 || 1.0 || 0.5 || 2.5 || 7.0
|-
| align="left" | Career
| align="left" | 1 year, 1 team
| 2 || 2 || 27.0 || .462 || .000 || .500 || 7.5 || 1.0 || 1.0 || 0.5 || 2.5 || 7.0

References

External links
Ole Miss Rebels bio

1999 births
Living people
American women's basketball players
Basketball players from Virginia
Forwards (basketball)
Maryland Terrapins women's basketball players
McDonald's High School All-Americans
Ole Miss Rebels women's basketball players
People from Fredericksburg, Virginia
Sportspeople from Fredericksburg, Virginia
Washington Mystics draft picks
Washington Mystics players